Donát Bárány (born 4 April 2000) is a Hungarian professional footballer who plays for OTP Bank Liga club Debrecen.

Career statistics

References

External links
 
 

2000 births
Living people
People from Debrecen
Hungarian footballers
Association football forwards
Hungary youth international footballers
Debreceni VSC players
Nemzeti Bajnokság I players